Virginia elected its members April 30, 1827, after the term began but before the new Congress convened.

See also 
 1826 Virginia's 5th congressional district special election
 1826 and 1827 United States House of Representatives elections
 List of United States representatives from Virginia

Notes 

1827
Virginia
United States House of Representatives